The Guaire River is a short river in Venezuela that flows through the nation's capital of Caracas. It is a tributary of the Tuy River and is 72 kilometers (45 miles) long in length. It rises in an area called Las Adjuntas in the Capital District of Venezuela at the confluence of the San Pedro and Macarao Rivers.

History

On 19 April 2017, during the 2017 Venezuelan protests, the Mother of all Protests occurred. Demonstrators began gathering around the country at about 10:30am, with Caracas having 26 different routes for the main march to head to the office of the Ombudsman to demonstrate. As the march progressed through Caracas, the National Guard began to block routes and fire tear gas at marchers at 11:50am, with the demonstrators refusing to leave despite the use of force. At about 12:30pm, demonstrations by both opposition and pro-government Venezuelans fill Caracas' avenues. Shortly after 12:45pm, protesters on the Francisco Fajardo Freeway near Bello Monte begin to flee the area, with many leaping into the Guaire River to avoid the gas, which is used for sewage drainage.

References

 “Guaire River.” Encyclopædia Britannica
 
 
 

Rivers of Miranda (state)
Rivers of Capital District (Venezuela)